Jorge Maradiaga (born 2 February 1972) is a Honduran athlete. He competed in the men's decathlon at the 1992 Summer Olympics.

References

1972 births
Living people
Athletes (track and field) at the 1992 Summer Olympics
Honduran decathletes
Olympic athletes of Honduras
Place of birth missing (living people)